Takas sa Impierno is a 1991 Philippine action film directed by Bebong Osorio. The film stars Ricky Davao, Cristina Gonzales, Paquito Diaz, Michael de Mesa and Dennis Roldan.

Cast
 Ricky Davao as Cornelio
 Cristina Gonzales as Ester
 Paquito Diaz as Mayor Sebastian
 Michael de Mesa as Julius
 Dennis Roldan as Edmund
 Robert Arevalo as Sarge
 Maritoni Fernandez as Katrina
 Robert Talabis as Mijares
 Jose Romulo as Chief
 Ernie Forte as Erning
 Lucita Soriano as Aling Minyang
 Conrad Poe as Sarge
 Jimmy Reyes as Sarge
 Tom Alvarez as Soldier
 Bert Garon as Soldier
 Ernie Madriaga as Soldier
 Melissa de Leon as Judge

References

External links

1991 films
1991 action films
Filipino-language films
Philippine action films
FLT Films films